Frederico Gil and Jaroslav Pospíšil won the last edition of the event in 2011, but chose not to compete.
Colombians Nicolás Barrientos and Carlos Salamanca defeated Brazilians Marcelo Demoliner and João Souza 6–4, 6–4.

Seeds

Draw

Draw

References
 Main Draw

Aberto Rio Preto - Doubles